Lincoln Creek is a stream rising in Doty Hills in the U.S. state of Washington. It is a tributary of the Chehalis River.

Lincoln Creek was named in the 1860s after Abraham Lincoln by an admirer of the 16th president.

References

 

Rivers of Lewis County, Washington
Rivers of Washington (state)